A riding habit is women's clothing for horseback riding.

Since the mid-17th century, a formal habit for riding sidesaddle usually consisted of:

 A tailored jacket with a long skirt (sometimes called a petticoat) to match
 A tailored shirt or chemisette
 A hat, often in the most formal men's style of the day (since the Victorian era, a top hat with a veil has been worn)

Low-heeled boots, gloves, and often a necktie or stock complete the ensemble.  Typically, throughout the period the riding habit used details from male dress, whether large turned cuffs, gold trims or buttons.  The colours were very often darker and more masculine than those on normal clothes.  Earlier styles can be similar to the dresses worn by boys before breeching in these respects. 

When high waists were the fashion, from roughly 1790 to 1820, the habit could be a coat dress called a riding coat (borrowed in French as redingote) or a petticoat with a short jacket (often longer in back than in front).

Origins
In France in the 17th century, women who rode wore an outfit called a devantiere.  The skirt of the devantiere was split up the back to enable astride riding. By the early 19th century, in addition to describing the whole costume, a devantiere could describe any part of the riding habit, be it the skirt, the apron,  or the riding coat. 

In his diary for June 12, 1666, Samuel Pepys wrote:

Two and a half centuries later, Emily Post would write:

Women's redingote

The redingote (or redingotte, redingot) is a type of coat that has had several forms over time. The name is derived from a French alteration of the English "riding coat", an example of reborrowing.

The first form of the redingote was in the 18th century, when it was used for travel on horseback. This coat was a bulky, utilitarian garment. It would begin to evolve into a fashionable accessory in the last two decades of the 18th century, when women began wearing a perfectly tailored style of the redingote, which was inspired by men's fashion of the time. Italian fashion also picked it up (the redingotte), adapting it for more formal occasions.

The redingote à la Hussar (from French redingote à la Hussarde) was trimmed with parallel rows of horizontal braid in the fashion of Hussars' uniforms.

The style continued to evolve through the late 19th century, until it took a form similar to today's redingote. The newer form is marked by a close fit at the chest and waist, a belt, and a flare toward the hem.

Gallery

Style gallery

References

 Cassin-Scott, Jack, Costume and Fashion in colour 1760–1920, Blandford press, 
 Payne, Blanche: History of Costume from the Ancient Egyptians to the Twentieth Century, Harper & Row, 1965. No ISBN for this edition; ASIN B0006BMNFS
 Tozer, Jane and Sarah Levitt, Fabric of Society: A Century of People and their Clothes, 1770–1870, Laura Ashley Press, 
 Takeda, Sharon Sadako, and Kaye Durland Spilker, Fashioning Fashion: European Dress in Detail, 1700–1915, LACMA/Prestel US 2010,

Notes
Pepys' diary for June 1666
Emily Post's Etiquette, 1922, Chapter XXXIII. Dress See paragraph 40 "Riding Clothes"
Riding Habits at the Regency Garderobe

External links

History of Riding Habits
 Woman's riding suit, 1900–1910, in the Staten Island Historical Society Online Collections Database
Back in the Habit: Side Saddle Fashion through the Ages

17th-century fashion
18th-century fashion
19th-century fashion
Rider apparel
Sportswear
History of clothing (Western fashion)
Suits (clothing)